Allison Hazel Brugger (born 9 December 1993) is a Swiss-American slam poet, comedian, cabaret artist and television presenter.

Life and career 
Hazel Brugger's father is the Swiss neuropsychologist Peter Brugger; her mother is an English teacher who is originally from Cologne. Since she was born in the United States, Hazel does not only have the Swiss, but also American citizenship.
She was raised in Dielsdorf near Zürich and has two older brothers. After having graduated in Bülach, she started studying philosophy and literature at the University of Zurich, but she eventually gave up her studies. When she was 17, she started her poetry slam career in Winterthur.

Between 2014 and 2017, Brugger used to write a fortnightly column for Das Magazin, a Swiss daily newspaper. From 2013 to 2014, she worked as a columnist for "Hochparterre" and the TagesWoche.
In 2015, she was the moderator of the live-talk "Hazel Brugger Show and Tell" in the Theater Neumarkt in Zürich which took place every two months.

On 9 October 2013, she won the Swiss champions' title of the fourth Poetry Slam Championships.  In November 2015, she started her first cabaret programme "Hazel Brugger passiert".
Since February 2019, she is on tour in Germany, Austria and Switzerland with her second solo programme "Tropical", which appeared on Netflix beginning 2 December 2020.

In October 2020 Hazel Brugger announced that she is pregnant. The father of her child is German comedian and author Thomas Spitzer. They have been married since 2020.

Career 
Since 2016 she has been a correspondent on the German political satire show heute-show on ZDF. On 26 April she had her first guest appearance in another ZDF satire-show called "Die Anstalt" – the insane asylum. In 2017 she won the Salzburger Stier, a prize for cabaret artists. She was the youngest person to ever win this award.

In 2019 Hazel Brugger started the production of a YouTube-series which she hosts with co-producer and author Thomas Spitzer (author). The show is called Deutschland Was Geht, which translates to What's up, Germany?. In the show Hazel and Thomas explore interesting and at times bizarre places together with various German comedians. In 2020 the show will be continued under the title What's up, Europe?

Hazel Brugger has been living in Cologne since 2016.

Guest appearances 
 Die Anstalt: 26 April 2016, 4 April 2017 and 22 May 2018
 Neo Magazin Royale: 1 September 2016
 Dittsche: 13 May 2016.
 Late Night Berlin: 2 December

Books 
 Ich bin so hübsch (I'm so pretty). Kein & Aber, Zürich 2016, .
 Hazel Brugger, Thomas Spitzer (Authors), Jannes Weber (Illustrations): Deutschland Was Geht – Das Wimmelbuch. Diogenes, Zürich 2021, .

Audiobooks 
 Hazel Brugger passiert* : live im Café Kairo Bern. Audio-CD, Der gesunde Menschenversand, Luzern 2016, .

Awards 
 2013: «Swiss Master» of Poetry-Slam
 2015: «Young Journalist of the Year» by the magazine Schweizer Journalist
 2016: «Swiss Columnist of the Year» voted by a survey conducted by Schweizer Journalist among 1400 journalists.
 2017: German prize for cabaret by the city of Mainz
 2017: Salzburger Stier
 2017: Bavarian cabaret prize for emerging artist
 2017: Swiss Comedy Award
 2017: German Comedy Award for emerging artist

References

External links 
 
 Hazel Brugger's website
 Christian Möller: Hazel Brugger – Durch die Gegend, Folge 25 (Interview-Podcast, 2017)

1993 births
Living people
Swiss poets in German
21st-century Swiss poets
Swiss comedians
Swiss women comedians
Swiss women poets
Swiss television presenters
Swiss women television presenters
Swiss emigrants to Germany
American poets
ZDF people